The People vs. Larry Flynt is a 1996 American biographical drama film directed by Miloš Forman, chronicling the rise of pornographer Larry Flynt and his subsequent clash with religious institutions and the law. It stars Woody Harrelson, Courtney Love as his wife Althea, and Edward Norton as his attorney Alan Isaacman. The screenplay, written by Scott Alexander and Larry Karaszewski, spans about 35 years of Flynt's life, from his impoverished upbringing in Kentucky to his court battle with Reverend Jerry Falwell, and is based in part on the U.S. Supreme Court case Hustler Magazine v. Falwell.

In addition to being a financial success, The People vs. Larry Flynt was acclaimed by critics and garnered Harrelson, Love, Norton and Forman multiple accolades and award nominations, including Best Actor for Harrelson and Best Director for Forman at the 69th Academy Awards. Forman won the Golden Globe Award for Best Director.

Plot
In 1952, 10-year-old Larry Flynt is selling moonshine in Kentucky. Twenty years later, Flynt and his younger brother, Jimmy, run the Hustler Go-Go club in Cincinnati. With profits down, Flynt decides to publish a newsletter for the club, the first Hustler magazine, with nude pictures of women working at the club. The newsletter soon becomes a full-fledged magazine, but sales are weak. After Hustler publishes nude pictures of former first lady Jackie Kennedy Onassis in 1972, sales take off.

Flynt becomes smitten with Althea Leasure, a stripper who works at one of his clubs. With Althea and Jimmy's help, Flynt makes a fortune from sales of Hustler. With his success comes enemies – as he finds himself a hated figure of anti-pornography activists. He argues with the activists, saying that "murder is illegal, but if you take a picture of it, you may get your name in a magazine or maybe win a Pulitzer Prize. However, sex is legal, but if you take a picture of that act, you can go to jail." He becomes involved in several prominent court cases, and befriends a young lawyer, Alan Isaacman. In 1975, Flynt loses a smut-peddling court decision in Cincinnati, but the decision is overturned on appeal; he is released from jail soon afterwards. Ruth Carter Stapleton, a Christian activist and sister of President Jimmy Carter, seeks out Flynt and urges him to give his life to Jesus. Flynt seems moved and starts letting his newfound religion influence everything in his life, including Hustler content. Althea detests the idea as she was molested by nuns during her years in Catholic School.

In 1978, during another trial in Georgia, Flynt and Isaacman are both shot by a man with a rifle while they walk outside a courthouse. Isaacman recovers, but Flynt is paralyzed from the waist down and uses a wheelchair for the rest of his life. Wishing he was dead, Flynt renounces his faith. Because of the emotional and physical pain, he moves to Beverly Hills and spirals down into depression and drug use. During this time, Althea also becomes addicted to painkillers and morphine.

In 1983, Flynt undergoes surgery to deaden several nerves in his back damaged by the bullet wounds, and as a result, feels rejuvenated. He returns to an active role with the publication, which, in his absence, had been run by Althea and Jimmy. Flynt is soon in court again for leaking videos relating to the John DeLorean entrapment case, and during his courtroom antics, he fires Isaacman, then throws an orange at the judge. He later wears an American flag as an adult diaper along with an Army helmet, and wears T-shirts with provocative messages such as "I Wish I Was Black" and "Fuck This Court." After spitting water at the judge Flynt is sent to a psychiatric ward, where he sinks into depression again. Flynt publishes a satirical parody ad in which Jerry Falwell tells of a drunken sexual encounter with his mother. Falwell sues for libel and emotional distress. Flynt countersues for copyright infringement, because Falwell copied his ad and used it to raise funds for his legal bills. The case goes to trial in December 1984, but the decision is mixed, as Flynt is found guilty of inflicting emotional distress but not libel. By that time, Althea has contracted HIV, which proceeds to AIDS. Some time later in 1987, Flynt finds her dead in the bathtub, having drowned.

Flynt presses Isaacman to appeal the Falwell decision to the Supreme Court of the United States. Isaacman refuses, saying Flynt's courtroom antics humiliated him. Flynt pleads with him, saying that he "wants to be remembered for something meaningful". Isaacman agrees and argues the "emotional distress" decision in front of the Supreme Court, in the case Hustler Magazine v. Falwell in 1988. With Flynt sitting silently in the courtroom, the court overturns the original verdict in a unanimous decision. After the trial, Flynt is alone in his bedroom watching old videotapes of a happy healthy Althea and himself before tragedy struck them both.

Cast

 Woody Harrelson as Larry Flynt
 Cody Block as young Larry
 Courtney Love as Althea Leasure
 Edward Norton as Alan Isaacman
 Brett Harrelson as Jimmy Flynt
 Ryan Post as young Jimmy
 Donna Hanover as Ruth Carter Stapleton
 James Cromwell as Charles Keating
 Crispin Glover as Arlo
 Vincent Schiavelli as Chester
 Miles Chapin as Miles
 James Carville as Simon Leis
 Richard Paul as Jerry Falwell
 Burt Neuborne as Roy Grutman
 Jan Tříska as Joseph Paul Franklin
 Nancy Lea Owen as Edith Flynt
 Kacky Walton as young Edith
 John Fergus Ryan as Larry Flynt Sr.
 John Ryan as young Larry Sr.
 Ruby Wilson as Singer at Rally
 Norm Macdonald as Network Reporter
 Aurélia Thierrée as Receptionist
 D'Army Bailey as Judge Mantke
 Larry Flynt as Judge Morrissey

Casting notes 
Both Bill Murray and Tom Hanks were considered for the role of Flynt. Flynt's brother, Jimmy, is played by Brett Harrelson, the real-life brother of Woody Harrelson. William J. Morrissey Jr., a Cincinnati court judge who sentenced Flynt in 1977, is played in the film by Larry Flynt himself.

Reception
Based on 56 reviews collected by Rotten Tomatoes, the film has an overall approval rating of 88%, with an average score of 7.70/10. The site's consensus states, "The People vs. Larry Flynt pays entertaining tribute to an irascible iconoclast with a well-constructed biopic that openly acknowledges his troublesome flaws." On Metacritic, the film has a weighted average score of 79 out of 100 based on reviews from 24 critics, indicating "generally favorable reviews".

Box office
The film opened on December 25, 1996, in a limited release, in 16 theatres, where it was a hit, before expanding to wide release, 1,233 theatres, on January 10, 1997. The film eventually grossed $20,300,385 in the United States and Canada. Internationally it did better grossing $23 million, for a worldwide total of $43 million against a $35 million budget.

Accolades

The film is recognized by American Film Institute in these lists:
 2008: AFI's 10 Top 10:
 Courtroom Drama Film – Nominated

See also
 Supreme Court of the United States in fiction

Notes

References

External links

 
 
 
 
 

1996 films
Films with atheism-related themes
1990s biographical drama films
1990s legal films
1996 LGBT-related films
American biographical drama films
American legal films
American LGBT-related films
1990s English-language films
Columbia Pictures films
American courtroom films
Films scored by Thomas Newman
Films about adult magazine publishers (people)
Films about freedom of expression
Films about paraplegics or quadriplegics
Films directed by Miloš Forman
Films set in California
Films set in Georgia (U.S. state)
Films set in Kentucky
Films set in Cincinnati
Films set in 1952
Films set in 1973
Films set in 1975
Films set in 1978
Films set in 1986
Films set in 1987
Films set in the 1950s
Films set in the 1970s
Films set in the 1980s
Films shot in Los Angeles
Films shot in Mississippi
Films shot in Tennessee
Films whose director won the Best Director Golden Globe
Golden Bear winners
Incest in film
Lesbian-related films
Films with screenplays by Scott Alexander and Larry Karaszewski
Cultural depictions of American men
Cultural depictions of publishers
Cultural depictions of activists
1996 drama films
Phoenix Pictures films
1990s American films